The 2002–03 Wichita Thunder season was the 11th season of the CHL franchise in Wichita, Kansas.

Regular season

Division standings

See also
2002–03 CHL season

Wichita Thunder seasons
Wich